The Academy Fellowship of the Academy of American Poets is awarded annually for "distinguished poetic achievement" at mid-career. Fellows are awarded a stipend which is $25,000.  The fellowship program was created in 1946, since 1995 given in memory of James Ingram Merrill.

The fellowship was the first of the academy's portfolio of awards; the academy's website describes it as "the first of its kind in the United States."

Academy fellows:

1937 	Edwin Markham
1946 	Edgar Lee Masters
1947 	Ridgely Torrence
1948 	Percy MacKaye
1950 	E. E. Cummings
1952 	Padraic Colum
1953 	Robert Frost
1954 	Louise Townsend Nicholl;  Oliver St. John Gogarty
1955 	Rolfe Humphries
1956 	William Carlos Williams
1957 	Conrad Aiken
1958 	Robinson Jeffers
1959 	Louise Bogan
1960 	Jesse Stuart
1961 	Horace Gregory
1962 	John Crowe Ransom
1963 	Ezra Pound;  Allen Tate
1964 	Elizabeth Bishop
1965 	Marianne Moore
1966 	Archibald MacLeish;  John Berryman
1967 	Mark Van Doren
1968 	Stanley Kunitz
1969 	Richard Eberhart;  Anthony Hecht
1970 	Howard Nemerov
1971 	James Wright
1972 	W. D. Snodgrass
1973 	W. S. Merwin
1974 	Léonie Adams
1975 	Robert Hayden
1976 	J. V. Cunningham
1977 	Louis Coxe
1978 	Josephine Miles
1979 	May Swenson;  Mark Strand
1980 	Mona Van Duyn
1981 	Richard Hugo
1982 	John Frederick Nims;  John Ashbery
1983 	James Schuyler;  Philip Booth
1984 	Richmond Lattimore;  Robert Francis
1985 	Amy Clampitt;  Maxine Kumin
1986 	Irving Feldman;  Howard Moss
1987 	Josephine Jacobsen;  Alfred Corn
1988 	Donald Justice
1989 	Richard Howard
1990 	William Meredith
1991 	J. D. McClatchy
1992 	Adrienne Rich
1993 	Gerald Stern
1994 	David Ferry
1995 	Denise Levertov
1996 	Jay Wright
1997 	John Haines
1998 	Charles Simic
1999 	Gwendolyn Brooks
2000 	Lyn Hejinian
2001 	Ellen Bryant Voigt
2002 	Sharon Olds
2003 	Li-Young Lee
2004 	Jane Hirshfield
2005 	Claudia Rankine
2006 	Carl Phillips
2007 	James McMichael
2008 	Brigit Pegeen Kelly
2009	Harryette Mullen
2010	Khaled Mattawa
2011	Joan Larkin
2012   Brenda Hillman
2013   Carolyn Forché
2014   Tracy K. Smith
2015   Marie Howe
2016   Natasha Trethewey
2017   Ed Roberson
2018   Martín Espada
2019   Ilya Kaminsky
2020    Carmen Giménez Smith

References

External links
Academy of American Poets website

American poetry awards
Awards established in 1937